Student en Stad is a local political party in Groningen in the Netherlands. Founded in November 1993, it is one of just a few student political parties that have been able to win seats in Dutch local elections, with other similar and successful examples being Studenten Techniek In Politiek in Delft and Student & Starter in Utrecht. The party currently holds one seat on the Groningen municipal council.

Although the party's general focus is on student issues, they have not confined themselves to single issue student politics, but rather help decision-making on a range of local issues in Groningen.

Election results

– Source:

References

External links
  (in Dutch)

Student political organisations in the Netherlands
Political parties established in 1993
Groningen (city)
1993 establishments in the Netherlands
Syncretic political movements
Local political parties in the Netherlands